Kamal Singh may refer to:

Kamal Singh (Guyanese cricketer) (born 1955)
Kamal Singh (Indian cricketer) (born 2000)
Kamal Singh (politician) (1926–2019), Indian politician from Bihar
Kamal Singh Airee (born 2000), Nepalese cricketer
Kamal Singh Dao, aide of Veer Surendra Sai during the Sambalpur uprising against the British
Kamal Singh Malik (born 1966), Indian politician, member of the 17th Legislative Assembly of Uttar Pradesh of India
Kamal Singh Narzary, member of Assam Legislative Assembly from Bijni Assembly constituency in Chirang district